Theodore is a cancelled computer-animated (CGI) show was produced by Cosgrove Hall Films for CBBC, about a Nuclear Organisation called "Radioactive Science and Technology Station" (RSTS), one of the workers Theodore the Main Character. It never aired due to ITV's absorbing of Cosgrove-Hall.

BBC children's television shows
British computer-animated television series